Ronald Ellis Tutt (March 12, 1938 – October 16, 2021) was an American drummer who played concerts and recording sessions for Elvis Presley, the Carpenters, Roy Orbison, Neil Diamond, and Jerry Garcia.

Early life
Born in Dallas, Texas, United States, Tutt was a native Texan and was involved with music and performing arts for most of his childhood. He played the guitar, violin and trumpet, and didn't take up the drums until he was seventeen.

In an early gig, he appeared on the same bill as a then little-known Elvis Presley. Tutt didn't think much of him, as his girlfriend spent the evening making eyes at him. Tutt recounted this story to Presley years later when he was working for him, which Presley found hilarious.

TCB Band
Tutt played for the TCB Band ("Taking Care of Business") the Elvis Presley touring and recording band, which he auditioned for in 1969. He flew in with his drum kit, which he set up in the recording studio, though while he was waiting to be called, another drummer walked in and began playing his kit. Tutt thought that he had lost the chance to even audition, as Gene Pello was incredibly experienced and seemed to be winning Elvis Presley over. However, Presley's manager, Colonel Tom Parker, did not want to waste any money having paid to fly Tutt and his drums over, and so Elvis was persuaded to give Tutt a turn. Elvis hired him that day saying, "You know Ronnie, those other drummers were good but they were doing their own thing. You were watching me all the time".

Tutt chose not to be sycophantic around Elvis, and remained forthright in his dealings with the star. Elvis respected him for this and they developed a good friendship, with Elvis once buying him an engraved solid gold Swiss watch.

Session musician: Billy Joel, Jerry Garcia, Gram Parsons, Emmylou Harris, Neil Diamond and others
Tutt played on Billy Joel's second and third albums: 1973's breakthrough, Piano Man (all tracks but "Captain Jack") and 1974's Streetlife Serenade. Other musician's albums Tutt played on include Emmylou Harris and Gram Parsons solo output.

Around early 1974, Tutt began recording and touring with the Jerry Garcia Band, and also Jerry Garcia's and Merl Saunders' brief Legion of Mary. Starting with Garcia's studio album Compliments (1974), Tutt played drums for the Jerry Garcia Band for four years before moving on. During this time, Tutt also played drums on Garcia's studio albums Reflections (1976) and Cats Under the Stars (1978). In 1982, however, Tutt returned to the studio with Garcia to help record Run for the Roses.

References

External links
Ron Tutt Interview NAMM Oral History Library (2011)
 
 

1938 births
2021 deaths
Musicians from Dallas
20th-century American drummers
American male drummers
20th-century American male musicians
Legion of Mary (band) members
TCB Band members
Jerry Garcia Band members
American rock drummers
American session musicians
American country drummers
Billy Joel Band members